The Iarnród Éireann 8200 Class electric multiple units were built for the Dublin Area Rapid Transit (DART). The units were two-car sets, of which there were five. They were numbered in the sequence 820X+840X. 820X units are power cars while 840X units are unpowered driving trailers.

History
The units first entered service in 2000. The units had operated in multiple with the 8500 and 8510 classes.

The five members of this class spent long periods out of service, the most recent being from summer 2007 until March 2008. Following a brief return to service of all coaches with the exception of 8204/8404, all units were withdrawn from service yet again, with Iarnród Éireann citing frequent breakdowns and small seating as their reason for early withdrawal. They were stabled in Fairview DART depot during these periods of being out of service.  In 2012 the units were  tendered for sale, but were not sold. They remain decommissioned at Inchicore Works, clear of catenary. There was some suggestion of Irish rail looking at options to get a locomotive to haul them in 2015/6.

Fleet details

See also

Multiple Units of Ireland
Dublin Area Rapid Transit
IE 8500, 8510 and 8520 Classes

External links
 Irish Rail Fleet Information webpage 

Iarnród Éireann multiple units

Alstom multiple units
1500 V DC multiple units